Notes

 Converted to Government Polytechnic (year)

Government Polytechnic colleges in Maharashtra, List of
Technical universities and colleges in India